In enzymology, a 2-hydroxyquinoline 5,6-dioxygenase is an enzyme that catalyzes the chemical reaction

quinolin-2-ol + NADH + H+ + O2  2,5,6-trihydroxy-5,6-dihydroquinoline + NAD+

The 4 substrates of this enzyme are quinolin-2-ol, NADH, H+, and O2, whereas its two products are 2,5,6-trihydroxy-5,6-dihydroquinoline and NAD+.

This enzyme belongs to the family of oxidoreductases, specifically those acting on paired donors, with O2 as oxidant and incorporation or reduction of oxygen. The oxygen incorporated need not be derived from O2 with NADH or NADPH as one donor, and incorporation of two atoms o oxygen into the other donor.  The systematic name of this enzyme class is quinolin-2-ol,NADH:oxygen oxidoreductase (5,6-hydroxylating). Other names in common use include 2-oxo-1,2-dihydroquinoline 5,6-dioxygenase, quinolin-2-ol 5,6-dioxygenase, and quinolin-2(1H)-one 5,6-dioxygenase.

References

 

EC 1.14.12
NADPH-dependent enzymes
NADH-dependent enzymes
Enzymes of unknown structure